Banjo shark may refer to:

Thornback guitarfish (Platyrhinoidis triseriata) of the eastern Pacific
Fiddler rays (Trygonorrhina spp.) of Australia